The 1965 Montana Grizzlies football team represented the University of Montana in the 1965 NCAA College Division football season as a member of the Big Sky Conference (Big Sky). The Grizzlies were led by second-year head coach Hugh Davidson, played their home games at Dornblaser Field and finished the season with a record of four wins and six losses (4–6, 2–2 Big Sky).

Schedule

References

Montana
Montana Grizzlies football seasons
Montana Grizzlies football